Turkana South Constituency is an electoral constituency in Kenya. It is one of six constituencies in Turkana County. The constituency was established for the 1963 elections. The constituency has eight wards, all electing councillors to the Turkana County Council.

Members of Parliament 
2013 Kenyan General election (2013)        James Ekomwa Lomenen       The Party of National Unity (TNA)
 2017 to date                                James Ekomwa Lomenen        Jubilee Party (JP)

Wards

References 

Constituencies in Rift Valley Province
Constituencies in Turkana County
1963 establishments in Kenya
Constituencies established in 1963